Alberic II (912–954) was ruler of Rome from 932 to 954, after deposing his mother Marozia and his stepfather, King Hugh of Italy.

He was of the house of the counts of Tusculum, the son of Marozia by her first husband, Duke Alberic I of Spoleto. His half-brother was Pope John XI. At the wedding of his mother to King Hugh of Italy, Alberic and his new stepfather quarreled violently after Hugh slapped Alberic for clumsiness. Infuriated by this and perhaps motivated by rumors that Hugh intended to have him blinded, Alberic left the festivities and incited a Roman mob to revolt against Hugh. In December 932 Hugh fled the city, Marozia was cast into prison, and Alberic took control of Rome.

Marriage and issue
In 936 Alberic married his stepsister Alda, the daughter of King Hugh of Italy and had one son by her, Count Gregory I of Tusculum. According to Benedict of Soracte, he also had one illegitimate son, Octavianus, by an unknown mistress. On his deathbed Alberic had Roman nobility and clergy swear they would elect Octavianus as pope.

Sources

Lexikon des Mittelalters.

References

912 births
954 deaths
10th-century rulers in Europe
10th-century Italian nobility
People of medieval Rome
Counts of Tusculum